Camptonotus is a genus of leaf-rolling crickets in the subfamily Gryllacridinae. It includes the following species are all found in the Americas:
Camptonotus affinis Rehn, 1903
Camptonotus americanus Bruner, 1915
Camptonotus australis Rehn, 1907
Camptonotus carolinensis (Gerstaecker, 1860)
Camptonotus jamaicensis Brunner von Wattenwyl, 1888

References

Ensifera genera
Gryllacrididae
Taxa named by Philip Reese Uhler